Wang Wu; ca. 1632-1690 was a Chinese painter and poet during the Qing Dynasty (1644–1912).

Wang was born in Wu country in the Jiangsu province. His style name was 'Qingzhong' and his sobriquets were 'Xuedian daoren and Wang'an'. Wang specialized in bird-and-flower painting, using a brilliant and minute style. Unlike many painters of the time, Wang was not affiliated with any school of painting.

Notes

References
 Barnhart, R. M. et al. (1997). Three thousand years of Chinese painting. New Haven, Yale University Press. 

1632 births
1690 deaths
Qing dynasty painters
Qing dynasty poets
Painters from Suzhou
Writers from Suzhou
Poets from Jiangsu